Andrej Kollár (born 4 November 1999) is a Slovak professional ice hockey forward currently playing for HC Kometa Brno in the Czech Extraliga (ELH).

Career
Kollár began his career with HK Dukla Trenčín, playing in their various Jr. teams in 2015. Later he played in Jr. teams for HK Nitra between 2016 and 2018. After that he played for their senior team.

Kollár previously played for HK Dukla Trenčín, HK Orange 20, HK Nitra and Muskegon Lumberjacks of the United States Hockey League.

Career statistics

Regular season and playoffs

International

References

External links

 

1999 births
Living people
Slovak ice hockey forwards
Sportspeople from Nitra
HK Nitra players
HK Dukla Trenčín players
HC Kometa Brno players
Muskegon Lumberjacks players
Slovak expatriate ice hockey players in the Czech Republic